Englemere Pond is a  biological Site of Special Scientific Interest on the southern outskirts of North Ascot in Berkshire. The site is also a Local Nature Reserve. It is owned by the Crown Estate and managed by Bracknell Forest Borough Council.

Geography

The nature reserve is situated between Martins Heron railway station and Ascot railway station. It features a shallow acidic lake and marsh land.

History

The land for most of its recorded history has been part of a great Royal Hunting Forest that surrounded Windsor Castle.

In 1990 the site was declared as a local nature reserve by Bracknell Forest Borough Council.

In August 2016 an unexploded old military shell was discovered in Englemere Pond and blown up in a controlled explosion by the police.

Fauna

The fauna of the reserve include the following:

Birds

Invertebrates

Reptiles, amphibians and other vertebrates

Grass snake
Common toad
Palmate newt
Adders

Flora

The flora of the reserve include the following:

Trees
Oak
Scots pine
Hornbeam
Rowan
Silver birch
Willow
Cherry
Alder

Other

Drosera rotundifolia
Calluna
Erica cinerea
Erica tetralix
Reed

References

Sites of Special Scientific Interest in Berkshire
Local Nature Reserves in Berkshire
Winkfield